Taralea is a genus of flowering plants in the family Fabaceae. It belongs to the subfamily Faboideae.

Taralea can be distinguished from other members of the Dipterygeae by:
a black and rugose petiolule; an elliptical, hairy ovary; a legume with elastic dehiscence; a circular, oval, compressed seed with a basal hilum; and an embryo that displays a cleft below the radical–hypocotyl axis and an inconspicuous plumule.

References

Dipterygeae
Fabaceae genera